The Bio Process Systems Alliance (BPSA) is a biopharmaceutical industry trade group of suppliers of single use components and single use systems for manufacturing processes.  It was created in 2006 through an alliance of 26 suppliers.

References
 

Pharmaceutical industry trade groups
Organizations based in Washington, D.C.